Eric Foner (born February 7, 1943) is an American historian. He writes extensively on American political history, the history of freedom, the early history of the Republican Party, African American biography, the American Civil War, Reconstruction, and historiography, and has been a member of the faculty at the Columbia University Department of History since 1982. He is the author of several popular textbooks. According to the Open Syllabus Project, Foner is the most frequently cited author on college syllabi for history courses.

Foner has published several books on the Reconstruction period, starting with Reconstruction: America's Unfinished Revolution - 1863-1877 in 1988. His online courses on "The Civil War and Reconstruction", published in 2014, are available from Columbia University on ColumbiaX.

In 2011, Foner's The Fiery Trial: Abraham Lincoln and American Slavery (2010) won the Pulitzer Prize for History, the Lincoln Prize, and the Bancroft Prize. Foner previously won the Bancroft Prize in 1989 for his book Reconstruction: America's Unfinished Revolution - 1863-1877. In 2000, he was elected president of the American Historical Association. He was elected to the American Philosophical Society in 2018.

Early life and education
Foner was born in New York City, New York, the son of Jewish parents, Liza (née Kraitz), a high school art teacher, and historian Jack D. Foner, who was active in the trade union movement and the campaign for civil rights for African Americans. Eric Foner describes his father as his "first great teacher," and recalls how,

deprived of his livelihood while I was growing up, he supported our family as a freelance lecturer. ... Listening to his lectures, I came to appreciate how present concerns can be illuminated by the study of the past—how the repression of the McCarthy era recalled the days of the Alien and Sedition Acts, the civil rights movement needed to be viewed in light of the great struggles of Black and White abolitionists, and in the brutal suppression of the Philippine insurrection at the turn of the century could be found the antecedents of American intervention in Vietnam. I also imbibed a way of thinking about the past in which visionaries and underdogs—Tom Paine, Wendell Phillips, Eugene V. Debs, and W. E. B. Du Bois—were as central to the historical drama as presidents and captains of industry, and how a commitment to social justice could infuse one's attitudes towards the past.

After graduating from Long Beach High School in 1959, Foner enrolled at Columbia University, where he was originally a physics major, before switching to history after taking a year-long seminar with James P. Shenton on the Civil War and Reconstruction during his junior year. "It probably determined that most of my career has been focused on that period," he recalled years later. A year later, in 1963, Foner graduated summa cum laude with a Bachelor of Arts in history. He studied at the University of Oxford as a Kellett Fellow; he received a BA from Oriel College in 1965, where he was a member of the college's 1966 University Challenge winning team, though he did not appear in the final, having already returned to the US. After graduating from Oxford, Foner returned to Columbia where he earned his doctoral degree in 1969 under the supervision of Richard Hofstadter. His doctoral thesis, published in 1970 as Free Soil, Free Labor, Free Men: The Ideology of the Republican Party Before the Civil War, explored the deeply rooted ideals and interests that drove the northern majority to oppose slavery and ultimately wage war against Southern secession.

Career

Writing on the Reconstruction Era
Foner is a leading authority on the Reconstruction Era.  In a seminal essay in American Heritage in October 1982, later reprinted in Reviews in American History, Foner wrote,

In the past twenty years, no period of American history has been the subject of a more thoroughgoing reevaluation than Reconstruction—the violent, dramatic, and still controversial era following the Civil War.  Race relations, politics, social life, and economic change during Reconstruction have all been reinterpreted in the light of changed attitudes toward the place of blacks within American society.  If historians have not yet forged a fully satisfying portrait of Reconstruction as a whole, the traditional interpretation that dominated historical writing for much of this century has irrevocably been laid to rest. 

"Foner has established himself as the leading authority on the Reconstruction period," wrote historian Michael Perman in reviewing Reconstruction.  "This book is not simply a distillation of the secondary literature; it is a masterly account – broad in scope as well as rich in detail and insight. "This is history written on a grand scale, a masterful treatment of one of the most complex periods of American history," David Herbert Donald wrote in The New Republic. C. Vann Woodward, in The New York Review of Books, wrote, "Eric Foner has put together this terrible story with greater cogency and power, I believe, than has been brought to the subject heretofore."

In a 2009 essay, Foner pondered whether Reconstruction might have turned out differently.

"It is wrong to think that, during the Civil War, President Lincoln embraced a single 'plan' of Reconstruction," he wrote. "Lincoln had always been willing to work closely with all factions of his party, including the Radicals on numerous occasions. I think it is quite plausible to imagine Lincoln and Congress agreeing to a Reconstruction policy encompassing basic civil rights for blacks (as was enacted in 1866) plus limited black suffrage, along the lines he proposed just before his death."

Foner's recent short summary of his views was published in The New York Times in 2015.

Secession and the Soviet Union
As a visiting professor in Moscow in the early 1990s, Foner compared secessionist forces in the USSR with the secession movement in the US in the 1860s. In a February 1991 article, Foner noted that the Baltic states claimed the right to secede because they had been unwillingly annexed. In addition, he believed that the Soviet Union did not protect minorities while it tried to nationalize the republics. Foner identified a threat to existing minority groups within the Baltic states, who were in turn threatened by the new nationalist movements.

Popular publications and documentaries
In a  New York Times op-ed, he criticized President Donald Trump's tweet calling for the preservation of Confederate monuments and heritage, stating that they represented and glorified white supremacy rather than collective heritage.

Media appearances
Foner has made multiple appearance on shows such as The Colbert Report and The Daily Show to discuss US history.

Reception
Journalist Nat Hentoff described Foner's The Story of American Freedom as "an indispensable book that should be read in every school in the land." "Eric Foner is one of the most prolific, creative, and influential American historians of the past 20 years," according to The Washington Post. His work is "brilliant, important," a reviewer wrote in the Los Angeles Times.

In a review of The Story of American Freedom in the New York Review of Books, Theodore Draper disagreed with Foner's conclusions, saying "If the story of American freedom is told largely from the perspective of blacks and women, especially the former, it is not going to be a pretty tale. Yet most Americans thought of themselves not only as free but as the freest people in the world."

John Patrick Diggins of the City University of New York wrote that Foner's Reconstruction: America's Unfinished Revolution, 1863–1877, was a "magisterial" and "moving" narrative, but compared Foner's "unforgiving" view of America for its racist past to his notably different views on the fall of communism and Soviet history.

Foner's book Gateway to Freedom: The Hidden History of the Underground Railroad (2015) was judged "Intellectually probing and emotionally resonant" by the Los Angeles Times. His previous book The Fiery Trial: Abraham Lincoln and American Slavery (2010) was described by Library Journal as "In the vast library on Lincoln, Foner's book stands out as the most sensible and sensitive reading of Lincoln's lifetime involvement with slavery and the most insightful assessment of Lincoln's—and indeed America's—imperative to move toward freedom lest it be lost."

Awards and honors
In 1989, Foner received the Avery O. Craven Award from the Organization of American Historians. In 1991, Foner received the Great Teacher Award from the Society of Columbia Graduates. In 1995, he was named Scholar of the Year by the New York Council for the Humanities.

In 2009, Foner was inducted as a Laureate of The Lincoln Academy of Illinois and awarded the Order of Lincoln (the State's highest honor) by the Governor of Illinois as a Bicentennial Laureate.

In 2012, Foner received The Lincoln Forum's Richard Nelson Current Award of Achievement.

In 2020, Foner was awarded the Roy Rosenzweig Distinguished Service Award from the Organization of American Historians which goes to an individual or individuals whose contributions have significantly enriched our understanding and appreciation of American history.

Personal life
Foner was married to screenwriter Naomi Foner (née Achs) from 1965 to 1977. Since 1982, Foner has been married to historian Lynn Garafola. They have a daughter.

Works

Books

  Reissued with a new preface.
 , editor
 , editor
 
 
 
  Political history; and winner, in 1989, of the Bancroft Prize, the Francis Parkman Prize, the Los Angeles Times Book Award, the Avery O. Craven Prize, and the Lionel Trilling Prize.
  An abridgement of Reconstruction: America's Unfinished Revolution.
 
 , editor
 
 
 
 
 , editor
 
 
  A survey of United States history, published with companion volumes of documents.
 
 , editor
 
 
 
 

Some of his books have been translated into Portuguese, Italian, and Chinese.

Selected articles
 
 
 
 
 
 
 
 
 
 
 
 
  Column on George W. Bush.
 
 
  Pdf.
 
 Foner, Eric, "The Corrupt Bargain" (review of Alexander Keyssar , Why Do We Still Have the Electoral College? , Harvard, 2020, 544 pp., ; and Jesse Wegman, Let the People Pick the President: The Case for Abolishing the Electoral College, St Martin's Press, 2020, 304 pp.), London Review of Books, vol. 42, no. 10 (May 21, 2020), pp. 3, 5–6. Foner concludes (p. 6): "Rooted in distrust of ordinary citizens and, like so many other features of American life, in the institution of slavery, the electoral college is a relic of a past the United States should have abandoned long ago." 
 Foner, Eric, "Whose Revolution?: The history of the United States' founding from below" (review of Woody Holton, Liberty Is Sweet: The Hidden History of the American Revolution, Simon & Schuster, 2021, 800 pp.), The Nation, vol. 314, no. 8 (18–25 April 2022), pp. 32–37. Highlighted are the struggles and tragic fates of America's Indians and Black slaves. For example, "In 1779 [George] Washington dispatched a contingent of soldiers to upstate New York to burn Indian towns and crops and seize hostages 'of every age and sex.' The following year, while serving as governor of Virginia, [Thomas] Jefferson ordered troops under the command of George Rogers Clark to enter the Ohio Valley and bring about the expulsion or 'extermination' of local Indians." (pp. 34–35.)      
 (Additional articles and book reviews are available at EricFoner.com)

References

Further reading
 
 
 
 Katz, Jamie. "Freedom Writer: Pulitzer Prize-winning Columbia historian Eric Foner '63, '69 GSAS personifies the great teacher and scholar who approaches his calling with moral urgency," Columbia College Today, Winter 2012–2013. online
 Snowman, Daniel, "Eric Foner", History Today Volume 50, Issue 1, January 2000, pp. 26–27.
 Kennedy, Randall, "Racist Litter" (review of Eric Foner, The Second Founding: How the Civil War and Reconstruction Remade the Constitution, Norton, October 2019, 288 pp.), London Review of Books, vol. 42, no. 15 (July 30, 2020), pp. 21–23. Kennedy quotes Foner (p. 23): "A century and a half after the end of slavery, the project of equal citizenship remains unfinished."

External links

 EricFoner.com – Professor Foner's homepage
 Books written by Eric Foner or edited or introduced by him
 American Historical Association – Bibliography of Foner's Books
 Fathom Source for Online Learning Foner discusses influential history books he has read.
 Excerpt from Eric Foner essay on the John Sayles film, Matewan in the book Past Imperfect: History According to the Movies edited by historian Mark C. Carnes
 The Left's Lion: Eric Foner's History – by Ronald Radosh
 Expert report by Eric Foner for University of Michigan Affirmative Action cases

Lectures
 Lectures from "The Civil War and Reconstruction" course series (videos): 1850–1861, 1861–1865, 1865–1890
 Eric Foner lecture "Who Owns History?" from the 2009 Key West Literary Seminar (audio recording)
 "The Story of American Freedom: 1776–2005" (video): MIT SPURS/Humphrey Program sponsored lecture by Eric Foner from the series "Myths About America."

Interviews
 interviews with on Democracy Now! about Foner's 2015 book Gateway to Freedom: The Hidden History of the Underground Railroad (et al.):
 part 1, begins ~35:38 in audio and video
 part 2: audio, video
 The Second American Revolution: Historian Eric Foner on slavery, freedom, and contemporary US politics. Jacobin. March 28, 2015.
 
 On Contact: Creative Forgetfulness with Eric Foner (interviewed by Chris Hedges). RT America on YouTube, September 18, 2017

1943 births
Historians of the Southern United States
Historians of the Reconstruction Era
Historians of race relations
American people of Russian-Jewish descent
Bancroft Prize winners
Pulitzer Prize for History winners
Columbia College (New York) alumni
Columbia Graduate School of Arts and Sciences alumni
Columbia University faculty
Fellows of Oriel College, Oxford
Jewish American historians
American male non-fiction writers
Living people
Presidents of the American Historical Association
Lincoln Prize winners
20th-century American historians
21st-century American historians
Academics of the University of Cambridge
Harold Vyvyan Harmsworth Professors of American History
The Nation (U.S. magazine) people
Members of the American Philosophical Society
Corresponding Fellows of the British Academy
Fulbright alumni